The 2013 Armor All Gold Coast 600 was a motor race for the Australian sedan-based V8 Supercars racing cars. It was the eleventh event of the 2013 International V8 Supercars Championship. It was held on the weekend of 25–27 October at the Surfers Paradise Street Circuit on the Gold Coast, Queensland.

The twelfth event on the Gold Coast saw Craig Lowndes take the championship lead from Triple Eight Race Engineering teammate Jamie Whincup after Whincup and co-driver Paul Dumbrell failed to finish the Saturday race, with Dumbrell causing a heavy crash for Greg Murphy before suffering a drive-train failure. Lowndes and co-driver Warren Luff won the race from pole ahead of Shane van Gisbergen and Jeroen Bleekemolen, the first Dutchman to stand on a V8 Supercar podium, and Mark Winterbottom and Steven Richards. David Reynolds won the first race of his career in the Sunday race, with he and co-driver Dean Canto winning from pole. Fabian Coulthard and Luke Youlden finished second ahead of Russell Ingall and Ryan Briscoe, Briscoe's first podium finish and Ingall's first since 2009. James Courtney and Murphy looked set to take victory until a steering problem put them out of the race. Whincup and Dumbrell finished fourth while Lowndes and Luff were eighth, leaving Lowndes with a six-point championship lead. Lowndes and Luff won the Endurance Cup ahead of Whincup and Dumbrell and Winterbottom and Richards.

Race results

Qualifying - Race 30

Top Ten Shootout

Race 30

Qualifying - Race 31

Race 31

Standings
 After 23 of 30 races.

References

External links
Official website
Official series website

Armor All Gold Coast 600
Sport on the Gold Coast, Queensland